International Okinawan Gōjū-Ryū Karate-dō Federation (IOGKF), is an international Martial Art organization covering Gōjū-ryū Karate. It was founded by Morio Higaonna (b. 1938) in July 1979.  The IOGKF was established for the purpose of protecting and preserving the traditional Gōjū-ryū karate style of Okinawan as an intangible cultural treasure in its original form as passed on by Gōjū-ryū founder, Chojun Miyagi. In 2012 Higaonna took up an advisory role within the Federation and appointed Tetsuji Nakamura as his successor and chief instructor of IOGKF International. Ernie Molyneux  and Henrik Larsen were also promoted to IOGKF Vice Chief Instructor at the same time and together the three formed the IOGKF International executive committee. In 2022 at the age of 84, Higaonna Sensei stood down from his role of Supreme Master and IOGKF.

Membership
Since its formation, the IOGKF has grown to have more than 55 affiliated countries and over 75,000 members worldwide.

Structure
IOGKF Structure:
 Founder of the IOGKF: Morio Higaonna
 World Chief Instructor & Chairman: Tetsuji Nakamura
 IOGKF Vice Chief Instructors: Ernie Molyneux and Henrik Larsen
 IOGKF Executive Committee: Tetsuji Nakamura, Ernie Molyneux, Henrik Larsen and Jorge Monteiro.
 IOGKF Advisors: Katsuya Yamashiro, Joe Roses, Luis Nunes, Pervez Mistry.
 IOGKF Technical Committee: Sydney Leijenhorst, Torben Svendsen, Paolo Spongia, Linda Merchant, Andy Franz.

References 

Sports organizations established in 1979
Karate organizations
Sports organizations of Canada